Parental age is the age of parents.
It may refer to:
Father's age
Mother's age